Ahmed Saleh is the eldest son of Yemeni President Ali Abdullah Saleh.

Ahmad Saleh may also refer to:

Ahmed Saleh (footballer, born 1977), Egyptian retired player
Ahmed Khalil Saleh (born 1972), Qatari footballer
Ahmed Saleh (Saudi footballer) (born 2001), Saudi footballer
Ahmed Samir (footballer, born 1991) (Ahmed Samir Saleh), Jordanian footballer
Ahmed Saleh (table tennis) (born 1979), Egyptian Olympic table tennis player
Hussein Ahmed Salah (born 1956), Djiboutian marathon runner